Le Jardin du Paradis is an opera in four acts by Alfred Bruneau to a libretto by Robert de Fiers and Gaston Arman de Caillavet after Hans Christian Andersen. It premiered at the Opéra de Paris 29 October 1923 and ran for 27 performances.

References

Operas
1923 operas
French-language operas
Operas by Alfred Bruneau
Operas set in France
Operas based on works by Hans Christian Andersen